Ciboure (meaning 'end of bridge') is a commune in the Pyrénées-Atlantiques department in south-western France.

It lies across the river Nivelle from the harbour of Saint-Jean-de-Luz.

Ciboure is, like its neighbour, a pretty town with many buildings of the traditional Basque style of Lapurdi.  The 16th-century church of St Vincent has an octagonal tower, Basque galleries and a Baroque altarpiece. Adjacent to Ciboure is the Fort of Socoa, a 15th-century fortress built by Louis XIII.

Geography

Climate
Ciboure has a oceanic climate (Köppen climate classification Cfb).

Population

Notable people
Ciboure was the birthplace of:
 Maurice Ravel
 Martin de Hoyarçabal
 Anne Marie Palli
 Philippe Bergeroo
 Michel de Sallaberry

Ciboure was home to:
 American Time magazine journalists and authors Charles Wertenbaker and Lael Tucker Wertenbaker, their son Christian and daughter Timberlake Wertenbaker, who grew up in the Basque Country and were educated in France.
 Florentino Goikoetxea, a Basque smuggler and, during World War II, a guide across the Pyrenees of Allied airmen shot down in occupied Europe and attempting to escape to neutral Spain. Florentino received the George Medal from Great Britain and the Legion of Honor from France.

See also
Communes of the Pyrénées-Atlantiques department
Untxin

References

Gallery

External links

Official website
Ciboure tourist office

Communes of Pyrénées-Atlantiques
Labourd
Fishing communities
Pyrénées-Atlantiques communes articles needing translation from French Wikipedia